Michael Chamberlin may refer to:

 Michael Chamberlin (biologist) (born 1937), American biologist
 Michael Chamberlin (comedian) (born 1977), Australian comedian
 Michael Chamberlin, president of The Advertising Club of New York, 1981–1982

See also
 Michael Chamberlain (1944–2017), Australian politician